Octeabriscoe may refer to several places in Moldova:

 Octeabriscoe, a village in Moşana Commune, Donduşeni district
 Octeabriscoe, a village in Văscăuţi Commune, Floreşti district
 Octeabriscoe, a village in Ţambula Commune, Sîngerei district